Khurram Murad (3 November 1932 – 19 December 1996) was a Pakistani scholar of Islam.

Career 

From 1975 to 1976, he was involved in the extension project of Masjid al-Haram in Mecca as he was a civil engineer by profession. During his time in NED he gained stature as a student leader and later served as Nazim-e-Ala of Islami Jamiat Talaba for session 1951–52.

Publications 

His works include:
 Way to the Quran (and an online website)
 Key to al-Baqarah
 The Quranic Treasures
 Islam – The Easy Way
 Who is Muhammad?
 Gifts from Muhammad
 Shariah: The Way to Justice
 Shari'ah: The Way to God
 Interpersonal Relations
 In the Early Hours: Reflections on Spiritual and Self-Development
 Sacrifice the making of a Muslim
 Dawah among Non-Muslims in the West
 Islam & Terrorism
 The Islamic Movement: Dynamics of Values Power and Change
 Islamic Movement in the West: Reflections on Some Issues
 Dying & Living for Allah
 Treasures of the Qur'an

Some of his booklets in Urdu are:
 Zikr-e-Ilahi ("Remembrance of God")
 Rabb se Mulaaqaat ("Meeting with the Lord")
 Dawat kai Nishan-e-Raah
 Imaanat Daary ("Honesty")
 Allah se Muhabbat ("Loving Allah")
 Hasad aur Bughz ("Jealousy & Envy")
 Rizq-e-halal ("Lawful Sustenance")
 Niyyat aur Amal ("Intention & Action")
 Hubb-e-Dunya ("Love of the World")
 Dil ki zindagi ("Life of the Heart")
 Ghalatiyon to Maaf Karna ("Forgiving Mistakes")
 Haqeeqat-e-Zuhd ("Reality of Piety")
 Urooj ka Raasta ("The Way to Elevation")

Notes

References
 Racius, Egdunas. 2004. The multiple nature of the Islamic Da'wa. Dissertation, University of Helsinki.

Further reading
Ansari, Humayun. 3 September 2002. Muslims in Britain. London: Minority Rights Group International (MRG).
 Musharraf, Mohammad Nabeel. Khurram J. Murad: An Overview of His Political and Scholarly Contributions. AJHISR,Vol.3,Issue 2.

External links
 UK Islamic Mission (parent organization of the Islamic Foundation)
 Islamworld.net
 Collection of English Books by Khurram Murad
 Collection of Books by Khurram Murad in PDF-format

1932 births
1996 deaths
Writers from Bhopal
Muhajir people
Pakistani Sunni Muslim scholars of Islam
Islamic democracy activists
Jamaat-e-Islami Pakistan politicians
Sunni Muslim scholars of Islam
Quran translators
Urdu-language non-fiction writers
Pakistani theologians
Pakistani civil engineers
20th-century translators
Muslim missionaries
Missionary linguists